Oakbrook, Oak brook or Oak Brook may refer to:

Places

United States

Illinois
 Oakbrook Terrace, Illinois, a city in DuPage County, a suburb of Chicago
 Oak Brook, Illinois, a city in DuPage County, a suburb of Chicago
 Oakbrook Center, a shopping mall in Oak Brook, Illinois

Other areas
 Oakbrook, Kentucky, a census designated place in Boone County
 Oakbrook Neighborhood, in Summerville, South Carolina

Schools
 Oakbrook Elementary School, in Clover Park School District, Washington
 Oakbrook Elementary School and Oakbrook Middle School, in Dorchester School District Two, South Carolina
 Oakbrook Elementary School, in Parkway School District, Missouri
 Oakbrook House, former mansion of steel baron Mark Firth, now part of Notre Dame High School

Other uses
 Henry Brandon, Baron Brandon of Oakbrook (1920–1999), British judge